A friendship bracelet is a decorative bracelet given by one person to another as a symbol of friendship. Friendship bracelets are often handmade, usually of embroidery floss or thread and are a type of macramé. There are various styles and patterns, but most are based on the same simple half-hitch knot. They resemble a friendship that is strong and everlasting.

The amount of thread used in bracelets varies depending on the pattern. The smallest pattern, a double chain knot, requires two strings while the candy stripe can have three or more strings depending on the desired thickness.

Friendship bracelets first became popular in the United States during the 1970s. As they are unisex, they are commonly worn by both male and female teenagers and children. They are now popular throughout the world and are not only popular among teenagers but among the older generation; they are popular among celebrities as well. Friendship bracelets can be worn on various occasions; for example, they are ideal as a fashion accessory at the beach because they are made of materials that will not be easily destroyed and with which one can swim freely.

History
Friendship bracelets are ancient, but their resurgence is modern. The modern popularity of friendship bracelets started in the 1980s when they were seen during protests about the disappearances of Mayan Indians and peasants in Guatemala. The friendship bracelets were brought into the United States by religious groups for use in political rallies.

Friendship bracelets can have many meanings and symbolic uses, such as friendship, folk art, or social statements. Although it is generally accepted that the origins of these colorful bands lie with the indigenous people of Central and South America, some decorative knots can be traced back to China from 481 to 221 BC.

Folklore 
According to tradition, one ties a bracelet onto the wrist of a friend as a symbol of friendship and may wish for something at that moment. The bracelet should be worn until it is totally worn out and falls off by itself to honour the hard work and love put into making it. The moment at which the band falls off on its own, the wish is supposed to come true.

Missanga

Missanga (from ) is an international good luck charm made from knotted embroidery floss, thread or gimp. Similar to friendship bracelets, it is made with basic knots as well as patterning techniques. Its basic structure is a three thread plaited braid. It is becoming a popular portable craft project.

Patterns

There are different types of friendship bracelets for example normal bracelets or alpha bracelets that are tied in different ways. Normal bracelets are tied diagonally while alpha bracelets are tied horizontally.

For each of the different types of friendship bracelets there is a big number of different patterns that get passed on from person to person or can be found in books or on websites. The amount of possible patterns is infinite. Only the most well known and most commonly used ones have names. These names vary slightly depending on location, but are overall similar.

 Alpha bracelets - knots are tied horizontally instead of diagonally, allowing for the creation of letters and symbols
Name/word bracelets
Rag rug
Normal bracelets - knots are tied diagonally
 1212 – uses only fb and bf knots, allowing for the creation of letters and symbols
Arrowhead
Braid
Candystripe – basic diagonal stripes
Flip flop candy stripe or flip flop zig zag
Chevron
Inverse chevron
Bordered chevron
Double chevron
Fishbone chevron
Diamonds
Hearts
Mini hearts
 Plaid
Zig zag
Other bracelets
 Chinese staircase
Double chain knot
 Knitted bracelets
 Swirl and braids (a combination of a braid and Chinese staircase)
 Wrapped bracelets
Zipper bracelets
Shaped bracelets – bracelets that have edges that are not straight or that have holes
Chain bracelets
Broken ladder (a combination of the chevron and the Chinese staircase)
Daisy chain
Totem Pole
Zolino

See also
 Braid
 
 Macramé
 Rainbow Loom
 Wonder Loom
 Paracord
 Raksha Bandhan

References

External links
 

Bracelets
Decorative ropework
Friendship
1980s fashion
1990s fashion
2000s fashion

es:Pulsera tejida